Etiquette in Asia varies from country to country even though certain actions may seem to be common. No article on the rules of etiquette, nor any list of faux pas, can ever be complete. As the perception of behaviors and actions vary, intercultural competence is essential. A lack of knowledge about the customs and expectations of Asian people can make even those with good intentions seem rude, foolish, and disrespectful.

Asian etiquette is often manifested with shades of "respect", "good manners" and "filial", and is highly influenced by Chinese culture.

Bangladesh 
Bangladeshi society is reserved and very structured. While the norms change or vary, there are timeless customs such as respect for the elders and high regard for family. Old people are always treated with deference and it is considered rude for a young person to be direct and opinionated when talking to elders. Even prolonged eye contact with a senior is considered bad manners.  

Bangladeshis are modest people and it is not recommended to give excessive praise and can be interpreted as insincere and offensive. Religion serves as a strong influence on etiquette. It is not acceptable for a man to shake hands with a woman if the latter did not offer a hand first. Along with social categorization, religion dictates what is allowed and prohibited. 

When it comes to business, the etiquette is similar to those found in other Asian countries such as not being direct when communicating one's position or ideas.

Brunei 

Etiquette in Brunei is similar to that of Malaysia.

China

Eating is a dominant aspect of Chinese culture and eating out is one of the most common ways to honour guests, socialize, and deepen friendships. Generally, Chinese etiquette is very similar to that in other East Asian countries such as Korea and Japan, with some exceptions. In most traditional Chinese dining, dishes are shared communally. Although both square and rectangular tables are used for small groups of people, round tables are preferred for large groups. There is a specific seating order to every formal dinner, based on seniority and organizational hierarchy. The seat of honour, reserved for the host or oldest person, is usually the one in the center facing east or facing the entrance. Chopsticks are used instead of forks and knives. In most Chinese restaurants, there is no tip required unless it is explicitly posted. Tea is almost always provided, either in advance of the diners being seated or immediately afterward. A verbal "thank you" (谢谢; xiexie) should be offered to the server pouring the tea.

India 

Etiquette in India shares many similarities with its South and Southeast Asian neighbours, however, there are exceptions found throughout the country.

Indonesia

It is important to understand that Indonesia is a vast tropical country of sprawling archipelago with extremely diverse culture. Each of these Indonesian ethnic groups has its own culture, tradition and may speak its own language. Each of them may adhere to different religions that have their own rules. These combinations made Indonesia a complex mixture of traditions that may differ from one place to another. Indonesia shares many of the points of etiquette with other Southeast Asian nations. As Indonesia has a Muslim majority population, some points of etiquette in the Middle East also apply. Following are some key points of Indonesian etiquette:

It is important to be considerate of other people's dignity. Shaming or humiliating people in public is considered extremely rude.

One should always use their right hand when shaking hands, offering a gift, handing or receiving something, eating, pointing or generally touching another person.

Japan

Japanese customs and etiquette can be especially complex and demanding. The knowledge that non-Japanese who commit faux pas act from inexperience can fail to offset the negative emotional response some Japanese people feel when their expectations in matters of etiquette are not met.
Business cards should be given and accepted with both hands. It is expected that the cards will immediately be inspected and admired, then placed on the table in front of the receiver for the duration of the meeting. After the meeting, cards should be stored respectfully and should never be placed in a back pocket. Business cards should not be written on. To be taken seriously at a business meeting, one must have business cards. When taken out, they should be in a cardholder – not a pocket.
It is a faux pas to accept a gift when it is first offered and the giver is expected to offer it multiple times (usually 3 times). Gifts are generally not opened in the giver's presence.
In greeting or thanking another person, it may be insulting if the person of lower status does not bow appropriately lower than the other person. However, foreigners are rarely expected to bow. The level and duration of the bow depends on status, age, and other factors.
Pouring soy sauce onto rice is considered unusual.
It is less common to pour one's own drink in a social setting. Generally, an individual will offer to pour a companion's drink and the companion, in return, will pour the individual's drink. Although if one person is drinking from a bottle to glass and the other one is drinking just from a glass, it is fine for the person to pour for themselves.
Blowing one's nose in public is a faux pas. Also, the Japanese do not use their handkerchief for hanakuso, which literally translates as "nose shit".
For women, not wearing cosmetics or a brassiere may be seen as unprofessional or expressive of disregard for the situation.
Though many Japanese are lenient with foreigners in this regard, it is a faux pas not to use polite language and honorifics when speaking in Japanese with someone having a higher social status. The Japanese honorific "san" can be used when speaking English but is never used when referring to one’s self. Japanese place surnames before given names but often reverse the order for the benefit of Westerners.
A smile or laughter from a Japanese person may mean that they are feeling nervous or uncomfortable, and not necessarily happy.
Tipping is rarely practiced in Japan, and can be considered as an insult, except in certain cases, such as tipping a surgeon for an operation, when visiting a high class ryokan, or when dealing with house movers. Consult the locals to be sure what is appropriate. If one can’t be bothered to wait for change, it is okay to tell a taxi driver to keep it.
In the rituals of a Japanese cremation, the relatives pick the bones out of the ashes with chopsticks, and two relatives may then hold the same piece of bone at the same time. This is the only occasion in which it is acceptable for two people to hold the same item at the same time with chopsticks. At all other times, holding anything with chopsticks by two people at the same time, including passing an item from chopsticks to chopsticks, will remind everyone witnessing this of the funeral of a close relative.

Korea

The number 4 is considered unlucky, so gifts should not be given in multiples of 4. Giving 7 of an item is considered lucky.
Blowing one's nose at the table, even if the food is spicy, is mildly offensive. If necessary, take a trip to the toilet or at least be very discreet.
In restaurants and bars, pouring one's own drink is a faux pas. Keep an eye on the neighbors' glasses and fill them if they are empty; they will do the same. To avoid over drinking, simply leave the glass near full. When pouring drinks, hold bottle in right hand, lightly place left hand on forearm near elbow.
When someone of a significantly higher social position pours one a drink, it is considered proper to turn away from that person when drinking it.
A couple kissing each other in public is a faux pas, since it is not seen as modest.
See also Traditional Korean table etiquette.

Malaysia
 It is considered rude to wear shoes inside a house. One would usually take off shoes outside the house and leave them by the door.
 When shaking the hand of elders (such as parents, grandparents or teachers) the younger person is expected to touch the top of the elder's palm with the tip of their nose or forehead to express respect. It is similar to kissing a hand, but only using the tip of the nose or forehead, not lips. This is generally done by the Malays or Malaysian Muslims as a sign of respect. It is considered rude to not "Salam" a person whether they are visiting or being visited.
 It is considered improper to show affection (such as kissing) one's partner or spouse in public as it is not showing modesty and piety.
 One usually eats with the right hand.
 When handing things to people either the right hand or both hands should be used, not the left hand.
 Girls should dress modestly and not wear revealing clothing.
 Malaysia’s population of Malays, Chinese and Indians all strive to maintain “face” and avoid shame both in public and private situations. Face can be lost by openly criticizing, insulting, doing something that brings shame to a group or individual, showing anger at another person. Face can be saved by remaining calm and courteous, using non-verbal communication to say “no” etc.
 People who are slightly older than one are called "kak" (to a girl, means older sister) and "abang" (to a boy, means older brother). "Adik" is used when referring to someone younger than the speaker (Both male and female, means younger sibling), people much older than the speaker, or people who are married with children "makcik" (aunty) or "pakcik" (uncle). It is respectful to call people by those names rather than their given names, even if they are not related to one.
 When greeting a Malaysian ruler or a royal family member, pressing the palms of one's hands together while giving a slight bow shows respect.
 It is also important to address others according to their honorifics.  For example, one must address a teacher as "Cikgu" and "Datuk" for someone given the honorary title by a head of state.  If unsure, it is better to address a man as "Encik" (Mister), and a woman as "Puan" (Mrs or Miss), or "Cik" (Miss).
 The head is considered sacred and should not be touched by hand.
 The feet are considered symbolically unclean and should not be used to point to a person or a thing, and the soles of the feet should not be directly exposed to another person when sitting down on the floor.
 Please point at someone using the thumb.  It is rude to point at someone with the index finger in Malaysia.
 To beckon someone, one motions downward with the palm of the hand facing the ground.  It is rude to beckon someone with the palm of the hand up.
 Never say "Oi!" when calling out someone.
 When speaking to elders, bosses or teachers, one should refrain from using the informal pronoun "aku" (me) and "kau" (you) and instead use "saya". Using "aku" and "kau" in conversations with parents and teachers is a sign of insolence, as the speaker acts as if treating them as equals.

Pakistan

In urban Sindh and in other parts of the country, men and women usually lower their head and lift their hand to their forehead to make the "adab" gesture when greeting each other, instead of a handshake.
 For respect, when a man is greeting a woman younger or around the same age as him, he must lightly put his hand on the top of her head, as touching the opposite gender is not considered modest. A woman must bow her head lightly and not look the man in the eyes unless the man is younger than the girl.
 Women greeting each other usually hug as a sign of respect, whether they know each other or not, and politely ask the guest to sit down while bringing something to eat or drink, even if the guest has no intention of eating.
 It is considered respectful to avoid eye contact between man and woman if the two have never met or have no relation with each other, and the woman should keep her head bowed down, especially if the man is in his older years or has higher power in society than her.

Philippines

Three centuries of Spanish and 48 years of American rule, as well as the influence of Japan, China, India, Middle East and the West, have added to the classic indigenous etiquette of the Philippines. It has become a unique and particularly formal sense of etiquette concerning social functions, filial piety and public behaviour. Age is an important determinant in social structure and behaviour, dictating the application of honour, precedence, and title.

Singapore
In Singapore, a former crown colony of the United Kingdom, many standards of etiquette in Western societies apply.

Thailand
The Thais hold their king in very high regard and any sign of disrespect is potentially an imprisonable offence under Lèse majesté law. There have been a number of people arrested in the past few years, for saying bad things about the Royal Family, including a man who was jailed for 30 years. Despite this, many northern and northeastern Thais, along with liberals and people of younger generations are now being a lot less respectful and more skeptical of the monarchy because of the controversies surrounding the royal family.
 Currency, postage stamps, magazines covers and any other items with the king’s image are never tossed to the ground or treated harshly.  Even licking the back of a postage stamp is considered disrespectful. Most especially, these items are never trod upon as it is a sign of utmost disrespect to place one’s foot above the head of the king. Money or other items dropped accidentally should immediately be picked up and reverently brushed, not trodden on to stop from rolling away.
The head is considered sacred in Thailand and should not be touched by hand.
The feet are considered symbolically unclean and should not be used to point to a person or a thing, and the soles of the feet should not be directly exposed to another person when sitting down on the floor.

Turkey

Family members and friends speak to one another using the second singular person sen, and adults use sen to address minors. In formal situations (meeting people for the first time, business, customer-clerk, colleagues) plural second-person siz is used almost exclusively. In very formal situations, double plural second-person sizler may refer to a much-respected person. Rarely, third person plural conjugation of the verb (but not the pronoun) may be used to emphasize utmost respect. In the imperative, there are three forms: second person singular for informal, second person plural for formal, and double plural second person for very formal situations. Thus, the imperative forms of the verb gelmek, "to come", are gel (second person singular, informal), gelin (second person plural, formal), and geliniz (double second person plural, very formal and not frequently used)
Turkish honorifics generally follow the first name, especially if they refer to gender or particular social statuses (e.g. Name Bey (Mr.), Name Hanım (Ms.), Name Hoca (teacher or cleric)). Such honorifics are used both in formal and informal situations. A newer honorific is Sayın, which precedes the surname or full name, and is not gender-specific. (e.g. Sayın Name Surname, or Sayın Surname). They are generally used in very formal situations.
Shoes are not worn inside; Turkish people don't want the floor to be stained by soil, sand or dust that may be attached to the soles. Instead, shoes are removed before entering the house, either left outside near the doorstep or placed in the shoe cabinet at the entryway, and often replaced with slippers. Just wearing socks is also acceptable in informal situations. There are also separate slippers used when using a bathroom, due to hygienic reasons.
As beliefs regarding bad luck from open umbrellas indoors are taken seriously by some people, close umbrellas before bringing them inside. Some people believe that passing a knife or scissors directly to a person is bad luck as well. These beliefs are especially common among the elderly.
Hosts typically insist that guests keep eating. One needn’t eat much, but should at least taste a bit of everything on the table and express appreciation for the taste and quality.
Food or any small favor in general will generally be offered more than once and it is polite to decline it the first time with an expression implying effort to avoid causing inconvenience.
Avoid hand gestures with which one is unfamiliar, such as making a fist with the thumb placed between the middle and index fingers. Many of these are offensive.
Any comment to a person about the appearance of the latter's female relatives or wife might be seen as rude.
If invited to dinner, one is expected to bring something (usually dessert). Avoid bringing alcohol unless sure that the host partakes. If the guest brings food or drinks (as usual) it is customary to offer it in the proper context during the visit.
Friends might greet each other by shaking hands and touching or kissing one or both of the cheeks. This is inappropriate for business.
Before starting to eat at the dinner table, one should wait for the elders to start eating first. But, while drinking water the minors have priority.
Blowing one's nose at a table is met with disgust and frowned upon even if one has cold. As sniffing is also considered rude at a table, it is best to clear one's nose at a toilet as often as necessary. These activities are in general regarded distasteful, and are best kept away from social interactions.
It is usually considered disrespectful to sit legs crossed near one's parents, grandparents, possibly other elderly relatives and in front of one's teacher. When sitting legs crossed, it is offensive to point one's hanging foot at someone, especially someone older or of higher status. Similarly, it is in general rude to show the bottom of one's shoes or feet.
A couple kissing each other is a faux pas in more conservative regions, since it is not seen as modest.
The entire country practices one minute of silence on 10 November at 9:05am. This silence is observed in the memory of the founder of Turkey, Mustafa Kemal.

See also 
Etiquette in Africa
Etiquette in Australia and New Zealand
Etiquette in North America
Etiquette in Europe
Etiquette in Latin America
Etiquette in the Middle East
Worldwide etiquette

References

External links
 Doing Business in India

Asia
Asian culture